Amgalangiin Chinzorig (born 18 December 1987) is a Mongolian international footballer. He has appeared 4 times for the Mongolia national football team.

References

1987 births
Mongolian footballers
Living people
Association football midfielders
Mongolia international footballers